Darvaleh-ye Pain (also Romanized as Darvaleh-ye Pā'īn; also known as Darvaleh-ye Soflá) is a village in Kalashi Rural District, Kalashi District, Javanrud County, Kermanshah Province, Iran. At the 2006 census, its population was 21, in 6 families.

References 

Populated places in Javanrud County